HMS Carmen (often El Carmen, or sometimes Carmine), was the Spanish frigate Nuestra Señora del Carmen, built in 1770 at Ferrol. The British Royal Navy captured her on 6 April 1800 and took her into service as HMS Carmen. She served in the Mediterranean until she returned to Britain in 1801. There the Admiralty had her laid-up in ordinary. She was sold in December.

Capture

On 5 April the squadron sighted a Spanish convoy comprising thirteen merchant vessels and three accompanying frigates, and at once gave chase. Leviathan and Emerald eventually opened fire on the rigging of two Spanish frigates in order to disable them; shortly afterward, both Spanish frigates surrendered.

Nuestra Señora del Carmen, Captain Don Fraquin Porcel, of 36 guns, 140 men, and 950 tons (bm), was sailing from Cadiz to Lima with a cargo of 1500 quintals of mercury, sundries of "Cards", and four 24-pounder guns stored for foreign service. She was newly coppered and had provisions for a four month voyage. She carried as a passenger Don Pedro Ynsencio Bejarano, Archbishop of Buenos Aires. Before she surrendered, Carmen had 11 men killed and 16 wounded.

Santa Florentina, Captain Don Mamuel Norates, of 36 guns, 114 men, and 950 tons (bm), had been traveling from Cadiz to Lima with 1500 quintals of mercury and sundry "Cards", and five 24-pounder guns. Before she surrendered she suffered 12 killed and 10 wounded, including Norates and her second captains.

On 7 April, the British sailed for Gibraltar with their prizes. On arrival they encountered Incendiary, which had made port the previous day with two captured vessels of its own. In all, the small British squadron managed to capture nine merchant vessels and two frigates. The Royal Navy took both frigates into service.

Royal Navy service
Captain William Selby commissioned Carmen in December 1800 for the Mediterranean station. She then proceeded to capture a number of merchant vessels.

3 Apr 1801 the French brig Gentil seconde, from Bayonne bound to Senegal, laden with bale goods and wine.
6 Apr 1801 detained the Spanish schooner San Josef.
23 May 1801 the Spanish mistico Jean Baptiste, from Cadiz bound to Vera Cruz, laden with bale goods, wine, and sundries, and since carried into Cadiz by the crew.
28 May 1801 the Spanish schooner Primivera y Concevida, from Magadore bound to Teneriffe, laden with wool and sundries.
21 Jun 1801 a Spanish tartane of unknown name, from Algeziras bound to Malaga, in ballast.
21 Jun 1801 the Spanish polacre Nostra Senora de los Dolores, from Algeziras bound to Cartagena, Spain.
21 Jun 1801 the Spanish tartane Senora St. Anna, from Algeziras bound to Malaga, with coals.

On 22 July 1801 letters arrived at Plymouth from Carmen, dated 4 June. The letters reported that she had captured four prizes, three of which arrived at Gibraltar Bay. Also Carmen,  Superbe, Venerable, and Cambrian''' had chased into Cadiz Bay, three French frigates. The frigates had had on board two French Centre Admirals and seamen for the Spanish squadron of 12 sail of the line fitting for sea there. The Spanish squadron had had to delay its sailing because one of the storehouses full of naval stores in the dock-yard had caught fire and been totally consumed. The four British vessels were waiting for Rear-Admiral Sir James Saumarez's squadron from Gibraltar to block the Spaniards up.

Because Florentina served in the Navy's Egyptian campaign between 8 March 1801 and 2 September, her officers and crew qualified for the clasp "Egypt" to the Naval General Service Medal that the Admiralty authorised in 1850 for all surviving claimants.Carmen and  arrived at Spithead on 9 November 1801, from Egypt.

FateCarmen'' arrived at Portsmouth on 2 December 1801 where she was laid up. The Principal Officers and Commissioners of His Majesty's Navy offered "El Carmen, 971 Tons, Copper-bottomed, lying at Portsmouth", for sale on 24 February 1802. She sold there that month.

Notes

Citations

References
 

1770 ships
Frigates of the Spanish Navy
Captured ships
Frigates of the Royal Navy
Ships built in Ferrol, Spain